This is an alphabetical list of significant composers who were born or raised in Russia or the Russian Empire.

A
 Els Aarne (1917–1995), born in present-day Estonia
 Evald Aav (1900–1939), born in present-day Estonia
 Juhan Aavik (1884–1982), born in present-day Estonia
 Arkady Abaza (1843–1915)
 Alexander Abramsky (1898–1985), born in present-day Ukraine
 Joseph Achron (1886–1943), born in present-day Lithuania
 Ella Adayevskaya (1846–1926)
 Nikolay Afanasyev (1820/1–1898)
 Vasily Agapkin (1884–1964)
 Alexander Alexandrov (1883–1946)
 Anatoly Alexandrov (1888–1982)
 Boris Alexandrov (1905–1994), son of Alexander
 Achilles Alferaki (1846–1919)
 Alexander Alyabyev (1787–1851)
 Anatoliy Andreyev (1941–2004)
 Iosif Andriasov (1933–2000)
 Boris Arapov (1905–1992)
 Anton Arensky (1861–1906)
 Sasha Argov (1914–1995)
 Mykola Arkas (1853–1909), born in present-day Ukraine
 Alexander Arkhangelsky (1846–1924)
 Eduard Artemyev (born 1937)
 Nikolai Artsybushev (1858–1937)
 Vyacheslav Artyomov (born 1940)
 Boris Asafyev (1884–1949)
 Mukhtar Ashrafi (1912–1975), born in present-day Uzbekistan
 Sergei Aslamazyan (1897–1978), born in present-day Armenia
 Lera Auerbach (born 1973)
 Arseny Avraamov (1886–1944)
 Artemi Ayvazyan (1902–1975), born in present-day Armenia
 Mikhail Azanchevsky (1839–1881)

B
 Vytautas Bacevičius (1905–1970), born in present-day Lithuania
 Afrasiyab Badalbeyli (1907–1976), born in present-day Azerbaijan
 Vladimir Bakaleinikov (1885–1953)
 Mily Balakirev (1837–1910)
 Sergey Balasanian (1902–1982), born in present-day Turkmenistan
 Sargis Barkhudaryan (1887–1973), born in present-day Georgia
 Veniamin Basner (1925–1996)
 Kārlis Baumanis (1835–1905), born in present-day Latvia
 Sonya Belousova (born 1990)
 Maxim Berezovsky (c. 1745 – 1777)
 Anastasiya Bespalova
 Timofiy Bilohradsky (c. 1710 – c. 1782)
 Matvey Blanter (1903–1990)
 Felix Blumenfeld (1863–1931)
 Leonid Bobylev (born 1949)
 Anatoly Bogatyrev (1913–2003), born in present-day Belarus
 Nikita Bogoslovsky (1913–2004)
 Alexander Borodin (1833–1887)
 Sergei Bortkiewicz (1877–1952), born in present-day Ukraine
 Dmitry Bortniansky (1751–1825), born in present-day Ukraine
 Rostislav Grigor'yevich Boyko (1931–2002)
 Yevgeny Brusilovsky (1905–1981)
 Vitaly Bujanovsky (1928–1993)
 Pavel Bulakhov (1824–1875), brother of Pyotr
 Pyotr Bulakhov (1822–1885), brother of Pavel
 Revol Bunin (1924–1976)
 Mutal Burhonov (1916–2002), born in present-day Uzbekistan

C
 Georgy Catoire (1861–1926)
 Catterino Cavos (1775–1840)
 Nektarios Chargeishvili (1937–1971)
 Gayane Chebotaryan (1918–1998)
 Yekaterina Chemberdzhi (born 1960)
 Yury Chernavsky (born 1947)
 Peter Chernobrivets (born 1965)
 Pavel Chesnokov (1877–1944)
 Tatyana Chudova (1944–2007)
 Alexander Chuhaldin (1892–1951)
 Näcip Cihanov (1911–1988)
 Jānis Cimze (1814–1881), born in present-day Latvia
 Mikalojus Konstantinas Čiurlionis (1875–1911), born in present-day Lithuania
 Georgi Conus (1862–1933), brother of Julius and Lev
 Julius Conus (1869–1942), brother of Georgi and Lev
 Lev Conus (1871–1944), brother of Georgi and Julius
 Serge Conus (1902–1988), son of Julius
 César Cui (1835–1918)

D
 Alexandre Danilevski (born 1957)
 Kostiantyn Dankevych (1905–1984), born in present-day Ukraine
 Alexander Dargomyzhsky (1813–1869)
 Emīls Dārziņš (1875–1910), born in present-day Latvia
 Volfgangs Dārziņš (1906–1962), son of Emils, born in present-day Latvia
 Karl Davydov (1838–1889)
 Stepan Davydov (1777–1825), born in present-day Ukraine
 Stepan Degtyarev (1766–1813)
 Edison Denisov (1929–1996)
 Leonid Desyatnikov (born 1955)
 Nikolay Diletsky (c. 1630 – after 1680)
 Issay Dobrowen (1891–1953)
 Victor Dolidze (1890–1933), born in present-day Georgia
 Sandra Droucker (1875–1944)
 Fyodor Druzhinin (1932–2007)
 Fedo Dubiansky (1760–1796)
 Alexandre Dubuque (1812–1897/8)
 Vernon Duke (1903–1969)
 Balys Dvarionas (1904–1972), born in present-day Lithuania
 Ivan Dzerzhinsky (1909–1978)

E
 Sophie-Carmen Eckhardt-Gramatté (1898–1974)
 Konstantin Eiges (1875–1950)
 Irina Elcheva (1926–2013)
 Boris Elkis (born 1973)
 Heino Eller (1887–1970), born in present-day Estonia
 Abdalla El-Masri (born 1962)
 Irina Emeliantseva (born 1973)
 Gustav Ernesaks (1908–1993), born in present-day Estonia
 Andrei Eshpai (1925–2015)
 Victor Ewald (1860–1935)

F
 Samuil Feinberg (1890–1962)
 Boris Feoktistov (born 1941)
 Vladimir Fere (1902–1971)
 Alissa Firsova (born 1986), daughter of Dmitri Smirnov and Elena Firsova
 Elena Firsova (born 1950)
 Boris Fitinhof-Schell (1829–1901)
 Veniamin Fleishman (1913–1941)
 Yevstigney Fomin (1761–1800)
 Isadore Freed (1900–1960)
 Grigory Frid (1915–2012)
 Alexander Fridlender (1906–1980)
 Arthur Friedheim (1859–1932)

G
 Ossip Gabrilowitsch (1878–1936)
 Varvara Gaigerova (1903–1944)
 German Galynin (1922–1966)
 Lūcija Garūta (1902–1977), born in present-day Latvia
 Aleksandr Gauk (1893–1963)
 Valery Gavrilin (1939–1999)
 Misha Geller (1937–2007)
 Alexander Glazunov (1865–1936)
 Reinhold Glière (1875–1956), born in modern-day Ukraine
 Mikhail Glinka (1804–1857)
 Elena Gnesina (1874–1967), sister of Mikhail Gnessin
 Mikhail Gnessin (1883–1957), brother of Elena Gnesina
 Alexander Goedicke (1877–1957)
 Alexander Goldenweiser (1875–1961)
 Alexander Goldstein (born 1948)
 Nikolai Golovanov (1891–1951)
 Boris Goltz (1913–1942)
 Evgeny Golubev (1910–1988)
 Alexander Gradsky (1949–2021)
 Alexander Gretchaninov (1864–1956)
 Alexander Griboyedov (1795–1829)
 Juozas Gruodis (1884–1948), born in present-day Lithuania
 Sofia Gubaidulina (born 1931)
 Tofig Guliyev (1917–2000), born in present-day Azerbaijan
 Yevgeny Gunst (1877–1950)
 Aleksander Gurilyov (1803–1858), son of Lev
 Lev Gurilyov (1770–1844)

H
 Niyazi Hajibeyov (1912–1984), son of Zulfugar
 Uzeyir Hajibeyov (1885–1948), born in present-day Azerbaijan 
 Zulfugar Hajibeyov (1884–1950), born in present-day Azerbaijan
 Jovdat Hajiyev (1917–2002), born in present-day Azerbaijan
 Miina Härma (1864–1941), born in present-day Estonia
 Vladimir Horowitz (1903–1989)
 André Hossein (1905–1983), born in present-day Uzbekistan
 Semen Hulak-Artemovsky (1813–1873), born in present-day Ukraine

I
 Alexander Ilyinsky (1859–1919)
 Mikhail Ippolitov-Ivanov (1859–1935)
 Timur Ismagilov (born 1982)
 Julius Isserlis (1888–1968)
 Ivan the Terrible (1530–1584)
 Mikhail Ivanov (1859–1920)
 Jānis Ivanovs (1906–1983), born in present-day Latvia

J
 Paul Juon (1872–1940)
 Andrejs Jurjāns (1856–1922), born in present-day Latvia

K
 Dmitry Kabalevsky (1904–1987)
 Murad Kajlayev (born 1931)
 Vasily Kalafati (1869–1942)
 Vasily Kalinnikov (1866–1901)
 Sandor Kalloś (born 1935)
 Alfrēds Kalniņš (1879–1951), born in present-day Latvia
 Jānis Kalniņš (1904–2000), son of Alfrēds, born in present-day Latvia
 Artur Kapp (1878–1952), born in present-day Estonia
 Eugen Kapp (1908–1996), son of Artur, born in present-day Estonia
 Villem Kapp (1913–1964), nephew of Artur, born in present-day Estonia
 Nikolai Kapustin (1937-2020)
 Nikolai Karetnikov (1930–1994)
 Daniil Kashin (1769–1841)
 Leokadiya Kashperova (1872–1940)
 Yuri Kasparov (born 1955)
 Alexander Kastalsky (1856–1926)
 Yakov Kazyansky (born 1948)
 Nikolay Kedrov Jr. (1905–1981), son of Nikolay Kedrov Sr.
 Nikolay Kedrov Sr. (1871–1940)
 Ivan Kerzelli (fl. 18th century)
 Aram Khachaturian (1903–1978), born in Georgia to an Armenian family
 Karen Khachaturian (1920–2011), nephew of Aram
 Ivan Khandoshkin (1747–1804)
 Yuri Khanon (born 1965)
 Tikhon Khrennikov (1913–2007)
 Igor Khudolei (1940–2001)
 Victor Kissine (born 1953)
 Dmitri Klebanov (1907–1987), born in present-day Ukraine
 Alexander Knaifel (born 1943)
 Lev Knipper (1898–1974), born in present-day Georgia
 Vladimir Kobekin (born 1947)
 Mikhail Kollontay (born 1952)
 Lev Konov (born 1952)
 Yelena Konshina (born 1950)
 Alexander Kopylov (1854–1911)
 Grigoriy Korchmar (born 1947)
 Arseny Koreshchenko (1870–1921)
 Nikolai Korndorf (1947–2001)
 Viktor Kosenko (1896–1938)
 Alexander Koshetz (1875–1944), born in present-day Ukraine
 Nikita Koshkin (born 1956)
 Serge Koussevitzky (1874–1951)
 Osip Kozlovsky (1757–1831)
 Pylyp Kozytskiy (1893–1960), born in present-day Ukraine
 Cyrillus Kreek (1889–1962), born in present-day Estonia
 Alexander Krein (1883–1951)
 Vyacheslav Kruglik
Yevgeny Krylatov (1934–2019)
 Andrei Krylov (born 1961)

L
 Ivan Larionov (1830–1889)
 Boris Ledkovsky (1894–1975)
 Albert Leman (1915–1998)
 Artur Lemba (1885–1963), born in present-day Estonia
 Mykola Leontovych (1877–1921), born in present-day Ukraine
 Zara Levina (1906–1976)
 Alexander Levine (born 1955)
 Yuri Levitin (1912–1993)
 Mischa Levitzki (1898–1941)
 Ekaterina Likoshin (fl. 1800–1810)
 Vasily Lobanov (born 1947)
 Aleksandr Lokshin (1920–1987)
 Arthur Lourié (1892–1966)
 Mihkel Lüdig (1880–1958), born in present-day Estonia
 Oleg Lundstrem (1916–2005)
 Alexei Lvov (1799–1870)
 Anatoly Lyadov (1855–1914)
 Lyudmila Lyadova (1925–2021)
 Sergei Lyapunov (1859–1924)
 Boris Lyatoshinsky (1895–1968), born in present-day Ukraine
 Mykola Lysenko (1842–1912), born in present-day Ukraine

M
 Muslim Magomayev (1885–1937), born in present-day Azerbaijan
 Heorhiy Maiboroda (1913–1992), born in present-day Ukraine
 Katerina Maier (fl. c. 1800)
 Nina Makarova (1908–1976)
 Leonid Malashkin (1842–1902)
 Dmitry Malikov (born 1970)
 Witold Maliszewski (1873–1939), born in present-day Ukraine
 Igor Markevitch (1912–1983), born in present-day Ukraine
 Mykola Markevych (1804–1860), born in present-day Ukraine
 Vladimir Martynov (born 1946)
 Mikhail Matinsky (1750 – c. 1820)
 Mikhail Matyushin (1861–1934)
 Samuel Maykapar (1867–1938)
 Jānis Mediņš (1890–1966), born in present-day Latvia
 Nikolai Medtner (1880–1951)
 Yuliy Meitus (1903–1997), born in present-day Ukraine
 Romanos Melikian (1883–1935), born in present-day Armenia
 Emilis Melngailis (1874–1954), born in present-day Latvia
 Zhanneta Metallidi (1934–2019)
 Moses Milner (1886–1953)
 Emil Młynarski (1870–1835), born in present-day Lithuania
 Boris Mokrousov (1909–1968)
 Kirill Molchanov (1922–1982)
 Fred Momotenko (born 1970)
 Alexander Mordukhovich (born 1946)
 Alexander Mosolov (1900–1973)
 Veli Mukhatov (1916–2005), born in present-day Turkmenistan
 Vano Muradeli (1908–1970), born in present-day Georgia
 Modest Mussorgsky (1839–1881)
 Mansur Muzafarov (1902–1966)
 Nikolai Myaskovsky (1881–1950)

N
 Nicolas Nabokov (1903–1978)
 Vyacheslav Nagovitsin (born 1939)
 Aleksey Nasedkin (1942–2014)
 Lev Naumov (1925–2005)
 Svetlana Nesterova
 Leonid Nikolayev (1868–1942)
 Tatiana Nikolayeva (1924–1993)
 Petro Nishchynsky (1832–1896), born in present-day Ukraine
 Mikhaïl Nosyrev (1924–1981)
 Anatoly Novikov (1896–1984)
 David Nowakowsky (1848–1921)

O
 Nikolai Obukhov (1892–1954)
 Eduard Oja (1909–1950), born in present-day Estonia
 German Okunev (1931–1973)
 Leo Ornstein (1895–2002), born in present-day Ukraine
 Vyacheslav Ovchinnikov (1936–2019)
 Dangatar Ovezov (1911–1966), born in present-day Turkmenistan
 Valdemārs Ozoliņš (1896–1973), born in present-day Latvia

P
 Aleksandra Pakhmutova (born 1929)
 Zacharia Paliashvili (1871–1933), born in present-day Georgia
 Boris Parsadanian (1925–1997)
 Vasily Pashkevich (c. 1742 – 1797)
 Boris Pasternak (1890–1960)
 Alla Pavlova (born 1952)
 Andrey Petrov (1930–2006)
 Ernest Pingoud (1887–1942)
 Mikhail Pletnev (born 1957)
 Daniil Pokrass (1905–1954), brother of Samuel and Dmitry
 Dmitry Pokrass (1899–1978), brother of Samuel and Daniil
 Samuel Pokrass (1894–1939), brother of Dmitry and Daniil
 Gavriil Popov (1904–1972)
 Sergei Prokofiev (1891–1953), born in present-day Ukraine
 Sergei Protopopov (1893–1954)

Q
 Abai Qunanbaiuly (1845–1904), born in present-day Kazakhstan

R
 Sergei Rachmaninoff (1873–1943)
 Alexander Radvilovich (born 1955)
 Nikolai Rakov (1908–1990)
 Eda Rapoport (1890–1968), born in present-day Latvia
 Alexander Raskatov (born 1953)
 Vladimir Rebikov (1866–1920)
 Levko Revutsky (1889–1977), born in present-day Ukraine
 Nadezhda Rimskaya-Korsakova (1848–1919)
 Nikolai Rimsky-Korsakov (1844–1908)
 Alexander Rosenblatt (born 1956)
 Nikolai Roslavets (1881–1944)
 Baruch Rosowsky (1841–1919), born in present-day Latvia
 Solomon Rosowsky (1878–1962), son of Baruch, born in present-day Latvia
 Olesya Rostovskaya (born 1975)
 Anton Rubinstein (1829–1894), brother of Nikolai
 Nikolai Rubinstein (1835–1881), brother of Anton
 Joseph Rumshinsky (1881–1956), born in present-day Lithuania
 Said Rustamov (1907–1983), born in present-day Armenia

S
 Mart Saar (1882–1963), born in present-day Estonia
 Leonid Sabaneyev (1881–1968)
 Martha von Sabinin (1831–1892)
 Tolibjon Sadikov (1907–1957), born in present-day Uzbekistan
 Vasily Safonov (1852–1918)
 Niescier Sakałoŭski (1902–1950), born in present-day Belarus
 Vadim Salmanov (1912–1978)
 Lazare Saminsky (1882–1959)
 Huseyngulu Sarabski (1879–1945), born in present-day Azerbaijan
 Joseph Schillinger (1895–1943)
 Alfred Schnittke (1934–1998)
 Eduard Schütt (1856–1933)
 Alexander Scriabin (1872–1915)
 Julian Scriabin (1908–1919), son of Alexander
 Tatyana Sergeyeva (born 1951)
 Alexander Serov (1820–1871)
 Valentina Serova (1846–1924)
 Vladimir Shainsky (1925–2017)
 Masguda Shamsutdinova (born 1955)
 Yuri Shaporin (1887–1966), born in present-day Ukraine
 Adrian Shaposhnikov (1888–1967)
 Rodion Shchedrin (born 1932)
 Nikolai Shcherbachov (1853–1922)
 Vladimir Shcherbachov (1889–1952)
 Vissarion Shebalin (1902–1963)
 Boris Sheremetev (1822–1906)
 Baluan Sholak (1864–1919), born in present-day Kazakhstan
 Dmitri Shostakovich (1906–1975)
 Andriy Shtoharenko (1902–1992), born in present-day Ukraine.
 Jean Sibelius (1965–1957), born in present-day Finland
 Nikolaï Sidelnikov (1930–1992)
 Alexander Siloti (1863–1945)
 Juhan Simm (1885–1959), born in present-day Estonia
 Yekaterina Sinyavina (died 1784)
 Gregory Skovoroda (1722–1794)
 Ādolfs Skulte (1909–2000), born in present-day Latvia
 Nicolas Slonimsky (1894–1995)
 Sergei Slonimsky (1932–2020), nephew of Nicolas
 Dmitri Smirnov (1948–2020)
 Vladimir Sokalsky (1863–1919)
 Ivan Sokolov (born 1960)
 Nikolay Sokolov (1859–1922)
 Mikhail Sokolovsky (1756 – after 1795)
 Nicolai Soloviev (1846–1916)
 Vasily Solovyov-Sedoi (1907–1979)
 Senya Son (born 1951)
 Antonio Spadavecchia (1907–1977)
 Alexander Spendiaryan (1871–1928)
 Alexei Stanchinsky (1888–1914)
 Maximilian Steinberg (1883–1946), born in present-day Lithuania
 Yakiv Stepovy (1883–1921), born in present-day Ukraine
 Kyrylo Stetsenko (1882–1922), born in present-day Ukraine
 Igor Stravinsky (1882–1971)
 Peeter Süda (1883–1920), born in present-day Estonia
 Grikor Suni (1876–1939), born in present-day Armenia
 Viktor Suslin (1942–2012)
 Yevgeny Svetlanov (1928–2002)
 Georgy Sviridov (1915–1998)

T
 Alexander Taneyev (1850–1918)
 Sergei Taneyev (1856–1915)
 Vladimir Tarnopolsky (born 1955)
 Boris Tchaikovsky (1925–1996)
 Pyotr Ilyich Tchaikovsky (1840–1893)
 Alexander Tcherepnin (1899–1977), son of Nikolai
 Nikolai Tcherepnin (1873–1945)
 Grigory Teplov (1717–1779)
 Armen Tigranian (1879–1950), born in present-day Armenia
 Nikoghayos Tigranian (1856–1951), born in present-day Armenia
 Dimitri Tiomkin (1894–1979), born in present-day Ukraine
 Boris Tishchenko (1939–2010)
 Alexey Titov (1769–1827)
 Nikolai Titov (1800–1875), son of Alexey
 Vasily Titov (c. 1650 – c. 1715)
 Rudolf Tobias (1873–1918), born in present-day Estonia
 Eduard Tubin (1905–1982), born in present-day Estonia
 Serafim Tulikov (1914–2004)

U
 Vladimir Ussachevsky (1911–1990)
 Galina Ustvolskaya (1919–2006)

V
 Raimond Valgre (1913–1949), born in present-day Estonia
 Alexander Varlamov (1801–1848)
 Sergei Vasilenko (1872–1956)
 Vladimir Vavilov (1925–1973)
 Artemy Vedel (c. 1767 – 1808), born in present-day Ukraine
 Alexander Veprik (1889–1958)
 Alexey Verstovsky (1799–1862)
 Yuliya Veysberg (1880–1942)
 Mikhail Vielgorsky (1788–1856)
 Ernests Vīgners (1850–1933), born in present-day Latvia
 Tony Vilgotsky (born 1980)
 Mykola Vilinsky (1888–1956), born in present-day Ukraine
 Jāzeps Vītols (1863–1948), born in present-day Latvia
 Vladimir Vlasov (1902/3–1986)
 Andrei Volkonsky (1933–2008)
 Alexander Vustin (1943–2020)

W
 Jacob Weinberg (1879–1956)
 Kazimierz Wiłkomirski (1900–1995)
 Alexander Winkler (1865–1935)
 Ivan Wyschnegradsky (1893–1979)

Y
 Grigor Yeghiazaryan (1908–1988), born in present-day Turkey
 Makar Yekmalyan (1856–1905), born in present-day Armenia
 Mikhail Youdin (1893–1948)
 Yuri Yukechev (born 1947)
 Aleksandr Yurasovsky (1890–1922)

Z
 Vsevolod Zaderatsky (1881–1953)
 Nikolai Zaremba (1821–1879)
 Marģeris Zariņš (1910–1993), born in present-day Latvia
Aleksandr Zatsepin (born 1926)
 Leo Zeitlin (1884–1930)
 Asaf Zeynally (1909–1932)
 Valery Zhelobinsky (1913–1946)
 Aleksey Zhivotov (1904–1964)
 Mikhail Zhukov (1901–1960)
 Alexander Zhurbin (born 1945)
 Efrem Zimbalist (1889–1985)
 Vasily Zolotarev (1872–1964)
 Vladislav Zolotaryov (1942–1975)
 Mariya Zubova (1749–1799)

See also

 Chronological list of Russian classical composers
 Lists of composers
 List of Russian people

 
Russian
Composers
 Russian music-related lists